Anthony "Tuba Fats" Lacen (September 15, 1950 – January 11, 2004) was a jazz tubist and band leader. Tuba Fats was New Orleans' most famous tuba player and played traditional New Orleans jazz and blues for over 40 years.

He was born, spent most of his life, and died in New Orleans, Louisiana. His music also took him on a number of tours of Europe, Asia, Australia, and South America.

He was known for many years to lead a band playing for tips in Jackson Square in the French Quarter, where he gave much encouragement to younger musicians.  He played professionally with brass bands such as the Young Tuxedo,  E. Gibson, Doc Paulin, Onward, Algiers, Treme, and Olympia Brass Bands, and with his own band, Tuba Fats & the Chosen Few Brass Band. Tuba Fats made many important jazz recordings; notably those under his own name on the Jazz Crusade label. Tuba Fats was married to the late blues shouter Linda Young with whom he often toured in Europe.

He was buried in a Catholic cemetery, St. Louis Cemetery No. 1, on January 18, 2004 after a jazz funeral.

Discography
 After You've Gone (with Linda Young) (Jazz  Crusade, 1985)
 Street Music (Jazz  Crusade, 1986 & 2003)
 A Jazz Gumbo Vols. 1 & 2 (with Linda Young) (Jazz  Crusade, 1993)
 In the Gutter (Jazz  Crusade, 1997)
 Big Bill Bissonnette's International Jazz Band Vols. 1 & 2 (Jazz  Crusade, 1997)
 Chosen Few Jazzmen (Jazz  Crusade, 2003)
 The Legendary Tuba Fats (A Wise and Barking Production, 2003)

External links 
 Jazz Funeral of Anthony "Tuba Fats" Lacen, January 18, 2004

1950 births
2004 deaths
American jazz tubists
American male jazz musicians
American jazz bandleaders
Jazz musicians from New Orleans
20th-century American musicians
20th-century American male musicians
Olympia Brass Band members
Young Tuxedo Brass Band members
Onward Brass Band members
Treme Brass Band members
Fairview Baptist Church Marching Band members
African-American Catholics
20th-century African-American musicians
21st-century African-American people